Cranchiinae is a subfamily containing four genera of glass squids.

Species
Genus Cranchia Leach, 1817
Cranchia scabra Leach, 1817
Genus Leachia Lesueur, 1821
Leachia atlantica (Degner, 1925)
Leachia cyclura Lesueur, 1821
Leachia danae (Joubin, 1931)
Leachia dislocata Young, 1972
Leachia ellipsoptera (Adams & Reeve, 1848)   
Leachia lemur (Berry, 1920)  
Leachia pacifica  (Issel, 1908)   
Leachia rynchophorus (Rochebrune, 1884)
Genus Liocranchia Pfeffer, 1884
Liocranchia gardineri *
Liocranchia reinhardti
Liocranchia valdiviae

The species listed above with an asterisk (*) are questionable and need further study to determine if they are a valid species or a synonym.

References

External links
 CephBase: Cranchiinae

Squid